Andrew 'Drew' Emelio (born 18 October 1981) is a former Tonga international rugby league footballer who played as a .

Background
Emelio was born in Sydney, New South Wales, Australia. He is Tongan Australian.

Playing career
Emelio previously played for the Bulldogs Rugby League Football Club and the Cronulla-Sutherland Sharks and the Widnes Vikings in the Super League. He joined the Penrith Panthers in the National Rugby League for 2009 but retired the following year.

Representative career
In October 2008, Emelio was named in the 24-man Tonga squad for the 2008 Rugby League World Cup and he played in one match during the tournament.

References

External links
Official Andrew Emelio NRL profile

1981 births
Living people
Australian rugby league players
Australian sportspeople of Tongan descent
Cronulla-Sutherland Sharks players
Canterbury-Bankstown Bulldogs players
Penrith Panthers players
Rugby league centres
Rugby league locks
Rugby league players from Sydney
Tonga national rugby league team players
Widnes Vikings players
Windsor Wolves players